{{Infobox
| bodystyle  = width:20em;
| abovestyle = background:inherit; font-weight:bold;
| labelstyle = background:inherit; white-space:nowrap;
| above      = <small>Harry Potter books</small>Short Stories from Hogwarts of Heroism, Hardship and Dangerous Hobbies
| image      = 
| caption    = 
| label1     = Author
| data1      = J. K. Rowling
| label2     = Illustrator
| data2      = 
| label3     = Genre
| data3      = Fantasy
| label4     = Auction date
| data4      =  
| label5     = Price
| data5      = £2.99 / US$3 / €2.99 
| label6     = Publisher
| data6      = 
| label7     = Publication date
| data7      = 6 September 2016
| label8     = Pages
| data8      = 72
}}Short Stories from Hogwarts of Heroism, Hardship and Dangerous Hobbies is an e-book written by J. K. Rowling, a guide to Hogwarts' teachers.

Publication history

This book was released at the same time as two others Hogwarts: An Incomplete and Unreliable Guide and Short Stories from Hogwarts of Power, Politics and Pesky Poltergeists as a part of a series named Pottermore Presents. It was released on 6 September 2016 in several languages at the same time.

Content
In this guide, the readers find information about Minerva McGonagall, Remus Lupin, Sybill Trelawney and Silvanus Kettleburn.

Reception
Kate Samuelson of Time.com expressed that the book contained a lot of surprising and intricate details about the characters as well as insight into the history of the wizarding world and interesting revelations of Rowling’s writing regrets. Some fans reacted negatively to the fact that most of the book's content had already been available for free online at Pottermore.

References

External links
 Short Stories from Hogwarts of Heroism, Hardship and Dangerous Hobbies'' at Goodreads

2016 short story collections
2016 children's books
Books by J. K. Rowling
British short story collections
Fantasy short story collections
Wizarding World books